Mājuli or Majuli is a river island in the Brahmaputra River, Assam and in 2016 it became the first island to be made a district in India. In the 1790s the island covered an area of 1300 sqare kilometers or (500 sq mi). Majuli has shrunk as the river surrounding it has grown. 

The island is formed by the Brahmaputra River in the south and the Kherkutia Xuti, an anabranch of the Brahmaputra, joined by the Subansiri River in the north. Mājuli island is accessible by ferries from the city of Jorhat. Mājuli is the abode of the Assamese neo-Vaishnavite culture.

Majuli is since 2004 in the UNESCO Tentative List for nomination as a World Heritage Site.

History

The island was a long, narrow piece of land called Majoli (land in the middle of two parallel rivers) that had the Brahmaputra flowing in the north and the Burhidihing flowing in the south until they met at Lakhu. It was once known as Ratnapur and was the capital of the powerful Sutiya kingdom. Frequent earthquakes in the period 1661–1696 set the stage for a catastrophic flood in 1750 that continued for 15 days, which is mentioned in historical texts and reflected in folklore. As a result of this flood, part of the Brahmaputra discharged southward into what was the Burhidihing's lower channel and Mājuli island was formed.

The Ahom king Pratap Singha built a rampart in Majuli called Meragarh.  Lakshmi Singha's grant of 1776 says it Majuli Pradesh and refers its Kamalabari Satra, Agnichapori, Gajala Satra and the river Tuni. During Moamaria rebellion, Majuli was controlled by Haoha, a moamaria rebel leader

The Burhidihing's point of confluence moved 190 km east and the southern channel which was the Burhidihing became the Burhi Xuti. The northern channel, which was previously the Brahmaputra, became the Luit Xuti. In due course, the flow in the Luit Xuti decreased, and it came to be known as the Kerkota Xuti; and the Burhi Xuti expanded via erosion to become the main Brahmaputra River.

The locals speak in Assamese and Mising language mainly. A few speak in the Deori language as well.

Mājuli has been the cultural capital of Assamese civilisation since the 16th century; based on written records describing the visit of Srimanta Sankardeva — a 16th-century social reformer. Sankardeva, a pioneer of the medieval-age neo-Vaishnavite movement, preached a monotheist form of Hinduism called Vaishnavism and established monasteries and hermitages known as satra on the islet.

The island soon became the leading center of Vaishnavinism with the establishment of these satras. After the arrival of the British, Majuli was under the rule of the British until India gained independence in 1947. It is as of 2016 the world's biggest river island.

Culture and demography

Population

The population of Majuli comprises the tribals, non-tribals, and the scheduled castes. The tribal communities include the Misings, the Deoris and the Sonowal Kacharis. The non-tribal communities include Koch, Kalitas, Ahoms, Chutias, Keot, Yogis, etc. The Mising community has the largest population in the island who immigrated from Arunachal Pradesh to Majuli centuries ago. Languages spoken are Mising, Assamese, and Deori. The island has 144 villages with a population of over 150,000 and a density of 300 individuals per square km.

Ferry service which operates six times a day connects Majuli to Jorhat city. Night super buses ply between Guwahti to Majuli via Lakhimpur.  Despite inherent drawbacks faced, modernism has touched this island, with the setting up of medical centers and educational institutions. Housing, too, has segued from traditional bamboo and mud construction to ones made of concrete.

Festivals

The festival of Ali aye ligang is celebrated during mid-February with great pomp and show. It is celebrated for five days starting from the second Wednesday of February till the next week (first Wednesday of fagun month ) Local dishes like purang apin (rice wrapped in special leaves), apong (rice beer) and dishes made of pork, fish, and chickens are served. Traditional Mising dance Gumrag Soman is performed in every village worshiping the almighty Donyi polo (mother sun and father moon) asking for good year of harvest.

Other festivals like Christmas is celebrated by the majority Christians of Mising tribe in upper Majuli where Jengraimukh village is the epicentre of Christians. Majuli has been the cultural capital and the cradle of Assamese civilization for the past 500 years. The satras set up preserve antiques like weapons, utensils, jewellery and other items of cultural significance. Pottery is made in Mājuli from beaten clay and burnt in driftwood fired kilns in the same mode carried out by the peoples of the ancient Harappan Civilisation. Sociologists have stressed the preservation of these unique peoples, whose culture and dance forms are untouched by modernism. The hand-loom work of these tribes is internationally famous.

Virtually every person on the island is involved in the three-day long raas festival, depicting the life of Krishna. People from hundreds of kilometers away come to celebrate this festival including a number of expatriate members of community. The satras have honed certain art and craft traditions, which can now be found only here. In Natun Samuguri Satra for example, one can still find the craft of mask-making; and in the Kamalabari Satra the finest boats are made.

Neo-Vaishnavite Satras
The island has been the hub of Assamese neo-Vaishnavite culture, initiated around the 15th century by the revered Assamese saint Srimanta Sankardeva and his disciple Madhavdeva. Many Satras or monasteries constructed by the saint still survive and represent the colourful Assamese culture. The saint took refuge in Mājuli and spent a couple of months at Belguri in West Mājuli, which was a place of grandeur for the historic and auspicious event known as 'Manikanchan Sanjog'; when Sankardeva met Madhavdeva for the first time. Sankardeva established the first satra in Belguri, Mājuli. After the "Manikanchan Sanjog", sixty-five satras were set up. However, today only twenty-two of the original sixty-five are operational. Sixty-five out of the six hundred and sixty-five original satras in Assam were situated in Mājuli.

The main surviving Satras (Satra) are:

 Dakhinpat Satra: Founded by Banamalidev, a supporter of Raasleela, which is now observed as one of the National Festivals of Assam.
 Garamur  Satra: This "Satra" was founded by Lakshmikantadeva. There are two Garamur Satra 1.Garamur bor Satra and 2.Garamur saru satra  During the end of autumn, the traditional Raasleela is enacted with pomp and celebrations. Ancient weapons called "Bartop" or cannons are preserved here.
 Auniati Satra: Founded by Niranjan Pathakdeva, the satra is famous for the "Paalnaam" and Apsara Dances and also its extensive assortment of ancient Assamese artefacts, utensils, jewellery and handicrafts. It also has a hundred and twenty-five disciples and over seven hundred thousand followers worldwide.
 Kamalabari Satra: The Kamalabari Satra, founded by Bedulapadma Ata, is a centre of art, cultural, literature and classical studies on the island. Its branch the Uttar Kamalabari Satra has performed cultural programmes of the Satria Art all around the country and abroad.
 Narashingha Satra: In the year of 1746 Shri Shri Alengi Narasingha Satra was established by Ahom King Promottra Singha. 
 Benegenaati Satra: It is a reliquary of antiques of cultural importance and an advanced centre of performing art. Muraridev, the grandson of Sankaradeva's stepmother was the founder of the Satra. The royal raiment belongs to the Ahom king Swargadeo Godadhar Singha, is made of gold. Also preserved is the royal umbrella made in gold.
 Shamaguri Satra: The satra is famous for the mask making in India.
 Bihimpur satra Satra: These satras are the treasure house of "Borgeet" Matiakhara, Satriya Dances (Jumora Dance, Chali Dance, Notua Dance, Nande Vringee, Sutradhar, Ozapali, Apsara Dance, Satria Krishna Dance, and Dasavater Dance), all promulgated by Srimanta Sankardeva. It has become a center for shuddhi in the Northeast of India, due to the efforts of Pitambar Deva Goswami.

Ecology

A wetland, Mājuli is a hotspot for flora and fauna, harbouring many rare and endangered avifauna species including migratory birds that arrive in the winter season. Among the birds seen here are the greater adjutant stork, pelican, Siberian crane and the whistling teal. After dark wild geese and ducks fly in flocks to distant destinations. The island is almost pollution free owing to the lack of polluting industries and factories and also the chronic rainfall.

The island is under threat due to the extensive soil erosion on its banks. The reason for this magnitude in erosion is the large embankments built in neighbouring towns upriver to prevent erosion during the monsoon season when the river distends its banks. The upshot is a backlash of the tempestuous Brahmaputra's fury on the islet, eroding most of the area. According to reports, in 1853, the total area of Mājuli was 1,150 km2 and about 33% of this landmass has been eroded in the latter half of 20th century. Since 1991, over 35 villages have been washed away. Surveys show that in 15–20 years from now, Mājuli would cease to exist.

To save the island, the Union Government of India has sanctioned ₹ 2.50 billion (US$55 million) for the protection of the island. The water resource department & The Brahmaputra Board have been struggling to solve the erosion problem of this island for the last three decades but without much success. Recently it was suggested that only a four-lane highway protected by concrete mat along the southern boundary of Majuli and the excavation of river bed of the Brahmaputra River can solve the problem. The project also includes two flood gates for the Kherkatia Suti which is a tributary of the Brahmaputra. The Brahmaputra River Restoration Project is yet to be implemented by the government. However, a nomination has been sent to UNESCO for the declaration of Mājuli as a World Heritage Site.

Local environmental activist Jadav Payeng has planted a 550-hectare forest, known as Molai Forest to combat erosion on the island. Much of the island was barren sandbars that were vulnerable to erosion, but thanks to Payeng's afforestation, has become a lush forest. The forest has become a habitat for animals including elephants, tigers, deer, and vultures.

Economy

Industries 
The main industry is agriculture, with paddy being the chief crop. Mājuli has a rich and diverse agricultural tradition, with as many as 100 varieties of rice grown. Fishing is also among the main industry after agriculture.  Among the fascinating arrays of rice produced are the Komal Saul, a unique type that can be eaten after immersing the grains in warm water for 15 minutes and usually eaten as a breakfast cereal; the bao dhan, that grows underwater and is harvested after ten months; and the Bora saul, a sticky brown rice used to make the traditional cake with fish is known as pitha. Fishing, dairying, pottery, handloom and boat-making are other important economic activities.

Handloom is a major occupation among the distaff population of the villages. Although largely a non-commercial occupation, it keeps many of the inhabitants occupied. Weaving is exquisite and intricate with the use of a variety of colours and textures of cotton and silk, especially Muga silk.
On 4 November 2017, Assam Chief Minister Sarbananda Sonowal launched 647 schemes with a total financial outlay of Rs. 246 million to boost Majuli's development.

Education sector

There are following higher learning institutions:
Majuli University of Culture
Majuli College Kamalabari
Jengraimukh College, Jengraimukh
Ujoi Majuli Kini Kherkotia Mahavidyalaya, Nayabazar
Rangachahi College
Pub Majuli College, Bongoan
Garamur college, Garamur

Tourism sector 

Mājuli is 20 km from Jorhat. One can take the bus or a hired taxi to the Nimati Steamer Ghat from where ferry services ply. The distance takes over three hours to cover, with three bus rides and two ferry rides.

On the north bank is the river Subansiri and on the south bank, the mighty Brahmaputra has exited the island from the mainland. Lakhimpur town is to the north and Golaghat is to its southwest. The town of Sibsagar is on the southeast and Jorhat is to the south. On the extreme east is Dibrugarh District.

 The Vaishnava Satras founded by Sankardeva
 The colourful culture of the tribes
 Migratory birds
 The Ali-ai-ligang festival in Feb–March
 Pottery making
 Mask making
 Paal Namm festival in the end of winter
 Folgu Utsav (Holi) 
 Madhya Majuli
 Namoni Majuli
 Ujoni Majuli
 Homespun masks crafts
 Porag Utsav
 Handmade Mekhla Chadar

Birdwatching
The southern part of the island is a bird lover's paradise. The best time to visit is between November to March as the weather and wildlife view is satisfactory. There are three locales for birdwatching:
 The southeast of the island
 The southwest of the island
 The northern part
 Sakuli Beel, near Kamalabari
 Magurmari Beel, Dakhinpaat Satra
 Verki Beel, near Kamalabari

Transport sector

Majuli Port has a roll-on/roll-off (RORO) ferry service with 2 low draft vessels operated on National Waterway 2 (NW2) by Inland Waterways Authority of India (IWAR) with capacity of 200 passenger, 4 cars and 2 trucks. Foundation stone has been laid on 18 February 2021 for the two-lane bridge on the Brahmaputra between Majuli (North Bank) and Jorhat (South Bank) that will connect Neematighat (on Jorhat side) and Kamalabari (on Majuli side).

Politics 

Majuli Assembly constituency falls under the 126 constituency of legislative assembly of Assam. Mājuli is one of the 9 assembly segments of Lakhimpur Lok Sabha constituency. It is a reserved seat for the Scheduled tribes (ST). It is under jurisdiction of Mising Autonomous Council having three constituencies. Rajiv Lochan Pegu [2001–2006 & 2006–2011, 2011– 2016] was MLA (Member of legislative assembly) from Mājuli in Assam Assembly until 2016. He was bearing the portfolio of Minister of State (Ind.), Water Resources Dev., WPT & BC, in the Government of Assam. Bhuban Gam of the BJP received 36,105 and was leading over Chittaranjan Basumatary of the Assam Jatiya Parishad by over 22,000 votes.

Literary scenario
Majuli island played a pivotal role in the literary landscape of Assam. Literary doyen, Neo Vaishnavite preacher Madhavdev met his guru Shankar Dev, the founder of Neo Vaishnavism in the island which is termed as "Mani Kanchan Sanjog". Madhavdev enriched Assamese literature with Namghosa, Borgeet and Bhatima, etc. Following the footsteps of the Vaishnavite leaders Satra institutions encouraged writing of plays and devotional songs. Second Assamese newspaper Asom Bilasini was published from Majuli in 1871 which played an active role in introducing blank verse in Assamese poetry. Majuli gave birth to a host of literary luminaries that includes well-renowned writers like Dr Dhruba Jyoti Borah, poet and critic Rajib Borah, bilingual critic and writer Bhaskar Jyoti Nath, Juri Borah Borgohain, Deba Bhusan Borah, historian Dr Dambarudhar Nath, novelist Gobin Khound, and poet Danny Gam. The island is very rich in the realm of art and literature which has significantly contributed to Assamese literature.

Photo gallery

See also

 Hindu pilgrimage sites
 National Geological Monuments of India
 List of villages in Majuli
 Tourism in Assam
 Yatra

References

External links

 
 Majuli.org maintained by Majuli Island Protection & Development Council (MIPDC)
 MajuliIslands.com An A to Z information website about the river island Majuli

 
Islands of Assam
Tourism in Assam
Tourist attractions in Assam
Hindu pilgrimage sites
Islands of the River Brahmaputra
Tourism in Northeast India
Biodiversity Heritage Sites of India
Islands of India
Populated places in India